The Team competition at the FIS Ski Flying World Championships 2020 was held on 13 December 2020.

Norway won the competition, winning their third consecutive title, while Germany finished second and Poland third.

Results
The first round was started at 16:00. The final round was held at 17:02.

References

Team